Hurricane Debby caused minor damage in the Greater and Lesser Antilles in August 2000. The seventh tropical cyclone, fourth named storm, and second hurricane of the annual season, Debby developed from a tropical wave east of the Lesser Antilles on August 19. Favorable conditions allowed the depression to become Tropical Storm Debby early on August 20, and further strengthening into a hurricane occurred 24 hours later. Debby made three landfalls on August 22, in Barbuda, Saint Barthélemy, and Virgin Gorda, before re-entering the Atlantic north of Puerto Rico. As Debby moved parallel to the north coast of Hispaniola late on August 23, it weakened back to a tropical storm. The storm tracked westward and weakened further, instead of approaching Florida and strengthening into a major hurricane. While south of eastern Cuba on August 24, Debby was downgraded to a tropical depression, six hours before completely dissipating.

Light rainfall and gusty winds caused minor damage in Barbuda, Saint Martin, and Trinidad and Tobago. In the United States Virgin Islands, brief blackouts and damage reaching $200,000 (2000 USD) was reported. The heavy precipitation resulted in mudslides and flooding, which in turn damaged roads, bridges, and houses. At least 406 homes on the island were flooded, five of which suffered moderate to severe damage. Additionally, there were many car accidents in San Juan due to slick roads. One indirectly fatality was reported after a man fell off his roof while attempting to remove a satellite dish. Damage on the island of Puerto Rico reached $501,000. In Dominican Republic, the Civil Defense Force reported that severe flooding in the northern portions of that country caused the evacuation of more than 700 people. Overall, the storm caused roughly $35,000 in damage across the island. Impact was lesser in Haiti, where squalls tore tin roofs off of numerous shanty homes and subsequently flooded a few. Additionally, rainfall in Cuba brought relief to an 8 month long drought impacting the region.

Meteorological history

A strong tropical wave emerged into the Atlantic Ocean from the west coast of Africa on August 16. By the following day, an area of low pressure was noted near 10°N 30°W. However, Dvorak classifications were not be initiated due to insignificant convective banding. At 0000 UTC on August 18, the National Hurricane Center's Tropical Analysis and Forecast Branch (TAFB) indicated a low-level circulation, though the system was still considered "too weak to classify". The TAFB released an initial classification later that day at 1145 UTC. Convective banding had increased, though the system as a whole was poorly organized. By late on August 19, convection had consolidated around a well-defined center of circulation. In the initial advisory by the National Hurricane Center, the agency noted a large area of convection, weak vertical wind shear, warm sea surface temperatures (SSTs), all of which produced a favorable environment for intensification.

The depression strengthened and became Tropical Storm Debby at 0000 UTC on August 20. Operationally, it was not upgraded to a tropical storm until 15 hours later. After classification, the center of circulation was difficult to locate due to the re-organization of convection. Although the circulation remained relatively disorganized, the central dense overcast (CDO) associated with Debby was large, symmetrical, and had cold cloud tops. By 0600 UTC on August 21, Debby had strengthened into a Category 1 hurricane. Additionally, Debby attained its minimum barometric pressure of  early on August 22. It was operationally not upgraded to a hurricane until 0900 UTC on August 22, due to a poorly defined circulation. Hurricane-force winds were very concentrated, extending only  from the storm's center of circulation.

A few hours later, the storm also struck Saint Barthélemy at the same intensity. In an advisory issued later that day, the National Hurricane Center noted that although the agency anticipated further strengthening, it would not be "significant" in the short-term, due to Debby's rapid movement west-northwestward and potential land interaction with Hispaniola. Early on August 23, computer models varied extensively with the Geophysical Fluid Dynamics Laboratory (GDFL) model, regarded by the National Hurricane Center as an "extreme outlier", depicting a  low pressure area over the Florida Keys on August 26. Due to increasing southwesterly wind shear, Debby began to weaken and was downgraded to a tropical storm at 1200 UTC on August 23, while situated north of Dominican Republic.

However, Debby curved westward and continued to become increasingly disorganized, with the low-level circulation being displaced well west of the main, deep convective area. Early on August 24, the storm entered the Windward Passage and began passing south of Cuba. The National Hurricane Center continued to predict re-intensification, but noted the potential for degeneration into a tropical wave during the next few days in its advisory at 0900 UTC on August 24, due to persistent wind shear. Three hours later, Debby was downgraded to a tropical depression. The storm degenerated into a tropical wave at 1800 UTC on August 24, while located south of Cuba.

Preparations

Several storm warnings were issued for the Greater and Lesser Antilles to warn residents of the approaching storm. In Philipsburg, Sint Maarten, several shops in the downtown area were boarded up to prepare for Debby's approach. Elsewhere along the range of the cyclone's predicted path, homes and businesses were boarded up, and families buried emergency supplies in the ground. On Antigua, electricity was shut off to prevent storm damage to the island's infrastructure. When the hurricane moved into the coastal waters of the U.S. Virgin Islands, the Hovensa oil refinery in St. Croix was shut down, and as a result gas prices rose.

Around 7,000 people in Cuba were evacuated to avoid the oncoming hurricane. Several shelters were opened by the Montserrat Red Cross on Montserrat, but few people sought refuge in them. Over 40 shelters were ready for use in Nassau, Bahamas, even though Debby never affected the island. A total of 889 people in the northern coastal plains were evacuated and placed in shelters out of Debby path. Three shelters were opened for the coming of Debby in Saint Thomas, and another two in Saint John. The total number of people in all five shelters only reached 64. An additional 17 people took refuge in an unknown number of shelters on St. Croix.

In addition, many tropical cyclone warnings and watches were posted in the Greater and Lesser Antilles. At 2100 UTC on August 20, a hurricane watch was issued for Sint Maarten, Saba, and Sint Eustatius, while there was a tropical storm watch for Antigua, Barbuda, and Anguilla. Early on August 21, the hurricane watch was expanded to include the United States Virgin Islands and Puerto Rico. Additionally, the tropical storm watch was extended out to the British Virgin Islands, Guadeloupe, Montserrat, Saint Barthélemy, Saint Kitts and Nevis, and Saint Martin. A hurricane warning was issued for Guadeloupe, Puerto Rico, and the Virgin Islands late on August 21. In Dominica, both a tropical storm warning and a hurricane watch were reported, while a tropical storm watch was put into effect in Dominican Republic. At 0300 UTC on August 22, a hurricane watch was issued for Haiti north of Port-au-Prince as was a tropical storm warning in Dominican Republic from Palenque to Cabrera. An hour later, a tropical storm watch was put into effect for the southeastern Bahamas and Turks and Caicos Islands. By 0900 UTC on August 22, Dominican Republic's entire north coast was under a hurricane warning. Additionally, the tropical storm watch for the southeastern Bahamas and Turks and Caicos Islands was upgraded to a hurricane watch.

The hurricane warning for Antigua, Barbuda, Guadeloupe, Montserrat, and St. Kitts and Nevis was discontinued at 1200 UTC on August 22, as was the tropical storm warning for Dominica. Three hours later, a hurricane warning was issued for the southeastern Bahamas and Turks and Caicos Islands, and another hurricane watch was posted for the central Bahamas. Additionally, the hurricane warning for Saba, Sint Eustatius, Sint Maarten, was discontinued. At 2100 UTC on August 22, a hurricane watch was issued in Cuba for the provinces of Holguín and Las Tunas, while a tropical storm warning was issued for Haiti north of Port-au-Prince. The hurricane warning for the United States Virgin Islands and Puerto Rico was lowered to a tropical storm warning, before being canceled early on August 23. Additionally, all watches and warning east of the United States Virgin Islands were discontinued. On August 23, a hurricane warning was issued for the central Bahamas and Cuba in the provinces of Guantanamo, Holguín, and Las Tunas. A hurricane watch was put into effect for the northwestern Bahamas and Cuba in Camagüey and Ciego de Ávila on the north coast and Santiago de Cuba and Granma on the south coast. By 1500 UTC on August 25, all of the remaining tropical cyclone watches and warnings were cancelled.

Although the hurricane was still situated far from Florida, a state of emergency was declared for the Florida Keys. Non-residents in Monroe County were forced to leave, causing a significant reduction in the tourism for the year 2000.

Impact
Because of the relatively weak and disorganized nature of the storm, impact throughout its path was widespread, but not particularly severe. Puerto Rico bore the brunt of the storm, followed by the United States Virgin Islands, then the Dominican Republic. Debby was attributed to about $735,000 in damage and 1 indirect fatality, which occurred in Puerto Rico when a man fell off a roof while attempting to remove a satellite dish.

Lesser Antilles

Throughout the Leeward Islands, gusty winds damaged fruit trees and downed power lines. Wind gusts estimated to have reached  lashed Anguilla. Some trees were destroyed, and electrical poles and power lines were downed. In Antigua, downed utility poles and trees were spotted. Rainfall on the island of Barbuda reached . Debby caused moderate roof damage to several structures and destroyed a few sheds and fruit trees. Sint Maarten reported little rainfall as the storm almost uneventfully passed over the island, causing mostly minor flooding and vegetation damage. Losses reached $750,000, though it was entirely from cruise ship cancellations and closed businesses. With damage nearly nonexistent, the Sint Maarten Tourism Bureau remarked that Debby "was the weakest hurricane St. Maarten experienced in several years."

Wind damage was minor, limited to some downed trees and power poles. Impact was minimal on Guadeloupe. Feeder bands from Debby affected countries as far south as Trinidad and Tobago, where heavy rainfall resulted in flooding in the Barrackpore region.

United States territories

In the United States Virgin Islands, losses reached approximately $200,000. On Saint Thomas,  of rain was recorded. Elsewhere on Saint Thomas, one sailboat was washed ashore on Vessup Beach. Additionally,  of rain fell in St. Croix. Minor landscape damage occurred on Saint John.

There were 406 homes affected from the flooding, 5 of which were moderately to severely damaged. Losses in Puerto Rico reached $501,000, primarily in the Caguas municipality. The storm was also indirectly responsible for the death of a 78-year-old man who fell while trying to remove a satellite dish from the roof of his home.

Dominican Republic
On the northern coast of the Dominican Republic, waves and rainfall caused light to moderate damage. Storm surge damaged about 20 homes and dozens of families were evacuated from Cabrera, Nagua, Río San Juan, and Samaná. In Nagua, several districts were left without drinking water and electricity after gusts blew down power cables and large trees. At San José de Matanzas, several coconut trees were uprooted from the ground. Also, two houses were slightly damaged from wind gusts. In the nearby town of La Vega, bridges over the Piedra River and Jumunucu River collapsed due to the heavy rainfall and flooding. In southern Puerto Plata, flooding in Aguas Negras, Playa Oeste and Dubeau districts forced dozens of families to leave their houses. In Monte Cristi, heavy rainfall caused flooding in various low-lying districts, with over 200 people affected in the coastal portion of the province. The country's Civil Defense Force stated that over 700 people on the northern coast were forced out of their homes after severe flooding. A wedding was also delayed at the Bavaro beach resort after flooding left the altar area suitable only for ducks.

Haiti
Residents living in shanties in northern Haiti fled their homes during the storm. In Port-de-Paix, strong winds tore off many tin roofs and flooded some homes. A small coastal village, Carenage, experienced high winds that sunk at least five boats. Storm surge also swept away one home, but without any reports of injury or death. Due to a severe eight-month drought in Guantanamo Province, the accumulated rainfall was largely beneficial. However, as a precaution against potential flooding, more than 32,000 people and thousands of cattle residing in low-lying areas were evacuated to higher ground. A few locations reported gusty winds. Additionally, tides caused coastal flooding in Baracoa.

See also

 Other storms of the same name
Timeline of the 2000 Atlantic hurricane season

Notes

References

External links

 Hurricane Debby NHC Tropical Cyclone Report
 Unisys track

Debby
Debby (2000)
Debby (2000)
Debby (2000)
Debby (2000)
Debby (2000)
Debby (2000)
Debby (2000)
Debby (2000)
Debby (2000)
Debby (2000)
Debby